The following is a list of ecoregions in Saudi Arabia, as identified by the Worldwide Fund for Nature (WWF).

Terrestrial ecoregions
Yemen lies on the boundary between two of the world's biogeographic realms. The Afrotropical realm covers the southeastern portion of the Arabian Peninsula, as well as Sub-Saharan Africa and Madagascar. The Palearctic realm covers the rest of the Arabian Peninsula as well as temperate Eurasia and Northern Africa.

Mediterranean forests, woodlands, and scrub
 Eastern Mediterranean conifer-broadleaf forests

Deserts and xeric shrublands
 Arabian desert (Palearctic)
 Persian Gulf desert and semi-desert (Palearctic)
 Red Sea Nubo-Sindian tropical desert and semi-desert (Palearctic)
 Southwestern Arabian montane woodlands (Afrotropical)
 Southwestern Arabian foothills savanna (Afrotropical)
 Arabian Peninsula coastal fog desert (Afrotropical)

Freshwater ecoregions
 Arabian Interior
 Southwestern Arabian Coast

Marine ecoregions
Saudi Arabia's seas are divided into three marine ecoregions, all part of the Western Indo-Pacific marine realm.
 Persian Gulf
 Northern and Central Red Sea
 Southern Red Sea

References
 Eric Dinerstein, David Olson, et al. (2017). An Ecoregion-Based Approach to Protecting Half the Terrestrial Realm, BioScience, Volume 67, Issue 6, June 2017, Pages 534–545 .
 Spalding, Mark D., Helen E. Fox, Gerald R. Allen, Nick Davidson et al. "Marine Ecoregions of the World: A Bioregionalization of Coastal and Shelf Areas". Bioscience Vol. 57 No. 7, July/August 2007, pp. 573-583.

 
Saudi Arabia
ecoregions